The Center for China and Globalization (CCG) is a Chinese think tank based in Beijing. It was founded in 2008 by a committee of the Western Returned Scholars Association, an organization under the United Front Work Department. CCG is a member of an alliance of think tanks, coordinated by the International Liaison Department of the Chinese Communist Party, that support the Belt and Road Initiative.

Leadership 
CCG was founded by Wang Huiyao and Mable Miao Lu, scholars who are reported to have ties to the Chinese Communist Party (CCP). Wang is a central committee member of the Jiusan Society, one of the country's eight legally-permitted minor political parties under the direction of the CCP. Wang has also served as a State Counselor. According to The Economist, Wang is a "something of a go-between for technocratic government ministries, Chinese entrepreneurs and foreign embassies in Beijing." Victor Gao is the vice president of the CCG.

Activities 
CCG has participated in forums with groups such as the Hudson Institute, Paris Peace Forum, and the China International Fair for Investment and Trade. 

In July 2018, CCG was granted consultative status with the United Nations Economic and Social Council. According to the 2020 Global Go To Think Tank Index by the University of Pennsylvania Think Tank and Civil Society Program (TTCSP), CCG ranked 64th of the top think tanks worldwide.

See also

 Government-organized non-governmental organization
 China Institutes of Contemporary International Relations

References

External links

Political and economic think tanks based in China
Foreign policy and strategy think tanks in China
Global economic research
Think tanks established in 2008
United front (China)